José Leandro Tolini (born 14 March 1990) is an Argentine field hockey player who plays as a defender for German Bundesliga club TSV Mannheim and the Argentine national team.

Club career
In 2010, Tolini moved to Belgium to play for the Waterloo Ducks. After one season, he moved to Spain to play for Taburiente who he also left after one season to return to Argentina to play for Ba. Na. De. For the 2014–15 season he moved back to Europe to play for Club de Campo. After four seasons in Spain, he moved back to Belgium to play for Gantoise. In April 2013, his contract at Gantoise was terminated early because he participated in the FIH Pro League for his national team and he couldn't return in time to play enough matches at the end of the Belgian Hockey League season. In April 2021 he signed for two years for Dutch Hoofdklasse club Tilburg. He scored 14 goals in his first season in Tilburg. Even though he had signed for two season he only stayed for one year because Tilburg were relegated from the Hoofdklasse. He joined German Bundesliga club TSV Mannheim in June 2022.

International career
Tolini was a part of the Argentina squad which won the 2013 Pan American Cup. In July 2019, he was selected in the Argentina squad for the 2019 Pan American Games. They won the gold medal by defeating Canada 5-2 in the final. He was the joint-topscorer of the competition with ten goals together with Maico Casella.

References

External links

1990 births
Living people
Field hockey players from Buenos Aires
Male field hockey defenders
Argentine male field hockey players
Field hockey players at the 2019 Pan American Games
Pan American Games gold medalists for Argentina
Pan American Games medalists in field hockey
Club de Campo Villa de Madrid players
División de Honor de Hockey Hierba players
Men's Belgian Hockey League players
Expatriate field hockey players
Argentine expatriate sportspeople in Belgium
Argentine expatriate sportspeople in Spain
Waterloo Ducks H.C. players
Men's Hoofdklasse Hockey players
Medalists at the 2019 Pan American Games
Field hockey players at the 2020 Summer Olympics
Olympic field hockey players of Argentina
Men's Feldhockey Bundesliga players
21st-century Argentine people